The 2019 European Parliament election was held in Malta on 25 May 2019. 8 different political parties took part in the election, of which, only 2  won seats in the European Parliament; the Labour Party and the Nationalist Party, with 4 and 2 seats respectively.

Contesting parties

Alleanza Bidla 
Ivan Grech Mintoff and Rebecca Dalli Gonzi contested on behalf of Alleanza Bidla.  a conservative Christian and Eurosceptic party.

Brain, Not Ego 
Antoine P. Borg contested on behalf of fledgling political party Brain, Not Ego.

Democratic Alternative 
Democratic Alternative announced the approval of its 3 European parliamentary election candidates. They were: Arnold Cassola, Mina Tolu and Carmel Cacopardo. In the wake of a dispute regarding the topic of abortion, Cassola resigned from Democratic Alternative and contested the EP election as an independent candidate.

Democratic Party 
The Democratic Party announced the approval of its 4 European parliamentary election candidates, They were: Martin Cauchi Inglott, Anthony Buttigieg, Godfrey Farrugia and Camilla Appelgren.

Imperium Europa 
Norman Lowell announced that he would once again contest the European parliamentary election after Imperium Europa was officially registered with the Electoral Commission.

Independents 
Arnold Cassola announced that he would contest the European parliamentary election as an independent candidate. Stephen Florian announced that he would contest as an Independent candidate after resigning from the executive of the Moviment Patrijotti Maltin. Other independent candidates included Nazzareno Bonnici (Partit Ta' L-Ajkla), Mario Borg and Joseph Aquilina.

Labour Party 
The Labour Party announced the approval of its 14 European parliamentary election candidates. They were: Alfred Sant, Mary Gauci, Lorna Vassallo, Robert Micallef, Cyrus Engerer, Alex Agius Saliba, Felix Busuttil, Miriam Dalli, James Grech, Joe Sammut, Josianne Cutajar, Fleur Vella, Noel Cassar and Josef Caruana.

Moviment Patrijotti Maltin 
Simon Borg and Naged Magelly contested on behalf of Moviment Patrijotti Maltin, an offshoot of the anti-immigration group Għaqda Patrijotti Maltin led by Henry Battistino which campaigns against irregular migration, Malta's participation in the Schengen Area, and Islam in Malta.

Nationalist Party 
The Nationalist Party announced the approval of its 10 European parliamentary election candidates. They were: Roberta Metsola, David Casa, Francis Zammit Dimech, Peter Agius, Dione Borg, Michael Briguglio, Frank Psaila, Roselyn Borg Knight, Michael Mercieca and David Stellini.

Opinion polls

Expressing a preference 
The values in the table below are derived by removing non-party responses (i.e. non-voters and "don't know"); as the margin is also recalculated, there may be slight differences in exact lead margins due to rounding.

Complete data

Results
Shortly after the first exit polls were announced, it was thought that Labour Party had a majority of 51,600 votes over the Nationalist Party, but this was later decreased to 42,656 after the official results came out. Although a large majority for Labour was expected, as well as Labour winning 4 out of 6 seats, the majority was unexpected and historic. Adrian Delia, the leader of the opposition, conceded defeat. He did state, however, that he would not resign because of the result and that his aim was still the next Maltese general election. Although the far-right political party Imperium Europa increased their vote share from 2.68% in the 2014 European Parliament election to 3.17% (at 8,238 votes) in the current election, this was far less than initially thought by the Maltese media, who had thought that they had received about 15,000 votes. The Democratic Party on the other hand, the only third party in the Maltese Parliament, only managed to get 5,276 votes, with Camilla Appelgren defying expectations by not only getting 3,052 votes, but also beating her own party leader Godfrey Farrugia, who only managed to get 1,668 votes.

The elected candidates were:

References

European Parliament elections in Malta
2019 in Malta
Malta